The piebald shrew (Diplomesodon pulchellum) is a shrew found in the Turan Lowland east of the Caspian Sea in Iran, Turkmenistan and Uzbekistan. It is the only extant member of the genus Diplomesodon. In 2011, A. Cheke described a new and possibly extinct species based on a 19th-century manuscript: Diplomesodon sonnerati (Sonnerat's shrew). It was described again in 2018 to meet certain validity requirements of the ICZN code.

References

Animal, Smithsonian Institution, 2005.

Mammals of Central Asia
White-toothed shrews
Mammals described in 1823